Wicklow County may refer to:
 County Wicklow, Ireland
 Wicklow County, Queensland
 Wicklow County, Western Australia

County name disambiguation pages